Pseudometachilo is a genus of moths of the family Crambidae.

Species
Pseudometachilo delius Bleszynski, 1966
Pseudometachilo faunellus (Schaus in Dyar, 1911)
Pseudometachilo irrectellus (Möschler, 1882)
Pseudometachilo subfaunellus Bleszynski, 1967

References

Natural History Museum Lepidoptera genus database

Crambinae